Michael Julius Schildberger (4 April 1938 – 2 June 2010) was an Australian journalist, radio and television presenter, and author. He is best known for hosting A Current Affair in the 1970s.

Career
Schildberger began his media career in 1955 when he joined The Sun News-Pictorial as a copy boy and subsequently became a cadet reporter.

In 1958 he moved to GTV 9 where he remained for the next twenty years. During the 1970s he was executive producer and national host of A Current Affair. For that role, he was awarded a 1976 Logie Award for Best TV Interviewer. While at A Current Affair he conducted the first full-length television interview with singer-songwriter Neil Diamond, who had only previously done brief group press conferences. The interview was in conjunction with Diamond's 1975-76 "Thank You Australia" tour and nationally broadcast live concert.

After leaving Channel 9, Schildberger worked for several years as Director of News for ATV 10 and FOX-FM. He then moved to Melbourne radio station 3LO where he hosted the morning program, with a short stint at 3DB.

In 1984 he founded the media production company Business Essentials.

Schildberger was diagnosed with prostate cancer in 1997. He achieved remission, and became a strong advocate of positron emission tomography. The cancer returned in early 2010. Schildberger died at the Cabrini Hospital in Prahran on 2 June 2010.

Publications

References

External links
The Age obituary
1989 profile of Schildberger in The Age

1938 births
2010 deaths
Australian reporters and correspondents
Australian television personalities
Deaths from cancer in Victoria (Australia)
Deaths from prostate cancer
German emigrants to Australia
Journalists from Melbourne
Logie Award winners
Radio personalities from Melbourne
People educated at Melbourne Grammar School